Marad (Sumerian: Marda, modern Tell Wannat es-Sadum or Tell as-Sadoum, Iraq) was an ancient Near Eastern city. Marad was situated on the west bank of the then western branch of the Upper Euphrates River west of Nippur in modern-day Iraq and roughly 50 km southeast of Kish, on the Arahtu River. The site was identified in 1912 based on a Neo-Babylonian inscription on a truncated cylinder of Nebuchadrezzar noting the restoration of the temple. In ancient times it was on the canal, Abgal, running between Babylon and Isin.

The city's main temple, a ziggurat, is E-igi-kalama (House which is the eye of the Land). was dedicated to Ninurta the god of earth and the plow, built by one of Naram-Sin's sons, as well as the tutelary deity Lugal-Marada.

History
Marad was established ca. 2700 BC, during the Sumerian Early Dynastic II period. Although Marad is not mentioned in the Sumerian King List and in the earliest city lists, it does appear in the temple hymns of the Early Dynastic period praising the city god of Marad, lugal-Marada. The city god of Kazallu, Numushda, is also sometimes mentioned in contracts. It was ruled by the Akkadian Empire, after its capture by Sargon of Akkad, under a governor. After the fall of that empire Marad fell under the sway of the Ur III empire, again via a governor. After control by Isin for a time Marad had a brief period of independence before it was captured by Babylon. Known kings from that independent period are Halun-pi-umu, Sumu-ditana, Sumu-atar, Sumu-numhim, and Yamsi-el. In Old Babylonian times Marad is often mentioned together with Kazallu. It is believed that they were part of the same kingdom. Marad was also occupied in Neo-Babylonian times. Nebuchenezar reports rebuilding the temp of Lugal-Marada:

Light occupation occurred in the Kassite and Parthian periods.

Archaeology

The site of Marad covers an area of about 124 hectares (500 acres).

Marad was excavated by a team from the Iraqi General Directorate of Antiquities and the Qādissiyyah University in 1990 led by Na'el Hannoon, and in 2005 and 2007 led by Abbas Al-Hussainy. During the latter excavation a number of cuneiform tablets were discovered, mainly from the Old Babylonian period but a few from Neo-Babylonian times. Most recently excavation occurred in Autumn 2019.

See also
Cities of the ancient Near East
Kazallu

Notes

References
Kutscher, Raphael. “Apillaša, Governor of Kazallu.” Journal of Cuneiform Studies, vol. 22, no. 3/4, 1968, pp. 63–65
FS Safar, Old Babylonian contracts from Marad, University of Chicago, Department of Oriental Languages and Literatures, 1938
Rients de Boer, Marad in the Early Old Babylonian Period: its Kings, Chronology and Isin's influence, Journal of Cuneiform Studies, vol. 65, pp. 73–90, 2013

External links
Envelopes’ made of clay have been unearthed in the ancient Mesopotamian city of Marad ...

Sumerian cities
Akkadian cities
Archaeological sites in Iraq
Former populated places in Iraq
Former kingdoms